Piazza della Libertà, meaning "Freedom/Liberty Square", may refer to the following places in Italy:

 Piazza della Libertà, Florence
 Piazza della Libertà, Rome
 Piazza della Libertà, San Marino
 Piazza Libertà, Udine, also known as Piazza della Libertà
 A piazza in Bagnacavallo, Ravenna, Emilia-Romagna
 A piazza in Civitanova Marche, Macerata, Marche
 A piazza in Macerata, Macerata, Marche
 A piazza in Sorbolo, Parma, Emilia-Romagna